Altair is an unincorporated community in Colorado County, Texas, United States. It is located at the four-way stop sign junction of U.S. Route 90 Alternate and State Highway 71. The community had an estimated population of 30 in 2000.

Geography
Altair is located at  (29.5713505, -96.4541355). It is situated along U.S. Highway 90A in south central Colorado County, about nine miles south of Columbus and 28 miles north of El Campo.

History
The community dates from the late 1880s. Located on the R.E. and John Stafford ranch property, the community developed into a cattle loading station that was initially called Stafford's Ranch. A post office at Stafford's Ranch was established on October 4, 1888, with John Stafford as postmaster. To avoid  confusion with the nearby town of Stafford in Fort Bend County, the post office name was changed to Altair on September 19, 1890. That same year, a town site was laid out and a branch of the Texas and New Orleans Railroad arrived. By 1897, Altair had a population around 100 with two stores, a gin, lumberyard, blacksmith shop, and hotel. A school house was also constructed in 1897 and a telephone line was laid from Columbus to Altair.

The community's relatively close proximity to the larger city of Columbus played a role in keeping Altair small. The population peaked around 200 in 1960 and had fallen to 80 by the mid-1970s. By the 1990s, the few businesses in Altair included a rice-drying facility, Kallina Dryer Inc., and the Blue Goose Hunting Club and Restaurant. The number of inhabitants had fallen to 30 in 2000.

Altair has a post office with the ZIP code 77412.

Education
Public education in the community of Altair is provided by the Rice Consolidated Independent School District. The district, which serves southern Colorado County, is headquartered in Altair and home to the Rice High School Raiders.

The designated community college for Rice CISD is Wharton County Junior College.

References

External links

Unincorporated communities in Colorado County, Texas
Unincorporated communities in Texas